Cyclograptidae is an extinct family of graptolites.

Genera
List of genera from Maletz (2014):

? †Alternograptus Bouček, 1956
? †Callodendrograptus Decker, 1945
†Calycotubus Kozłowski, 1949
†Camarotubus Mierzejewski, 2001
†Conitubus Kozłowski, 1949
†Cyclograptus Spencer, 1883
†Dendrotubus Kozłowski, 1949
†Discograptus Wiman, 1901
†Dyadograptus Obut, 1960
†Galeograptus Wiman, 1901
†Kozlowskitubus Mierzejewski, 1978
†Marsipograptus Ruedemann, 1936
†Multitubus Skevington, 1963
†Parvitubus Skevington, 1963
†Reticulograptus Wiman, 1901
†Rhiphidodendrum Kozłowski, 1949
†Rodonograptus Počta, 1894
†Siberiodendrum Obut, 1964
†Syrriphidograptus Poulsen, 1924
†Tubidendrum Kozłowski, 1949

References

Graptolites
Prehistoric hemichordate families